Batman: Noël is an original 2011 graphic novel written and illustrated by Lee Bermejo, who previously did the artwork for Joker. It is based on Charles Dickens' classic 1843 novella A Christmas Carol and features characters from both Dickens and the Batman mythos. Like Joker, the story is narrated by one of the Joker's henchmen.

Plot
During winter in Gotham City, a financially struggling man named Bob, picks up a package full of money from a trash can; it is implied he is delivering the money as a bagman for the Joker. Almost immediately, Batman (referred to as Scrooge by the narrator), drops from above, attacks Bob and demands to know where the Joker is. When the terrified Bob tells him that he does not know, Batman lets him go, but secretly attaches a tracer to him as he runs home to his son, Tim, who lives with him in a shabby apartment. Like the original Tiny Tim, Tim is in poor health and has a disabled leg. Although disabled, Tim is good-spirited and attempts to brighten up their drab apartment with a makeshift Christmas tree made of junk items. Bob is too terrified of the Joker (and Batman) to share any holiday cheer. Lurking outside the apartment, Batman assumes the Joker will come to retrieve the lost money and intends to use Bob (and indirectly, Tim) as bait to capture the Joker.

Back at the Batcave, Bruce watches Bob and his son, informing Alfred that he intends for the father to be arrested so his son will be too terrified to follow in his footsteps. During this, Bruce constantly hacks and coughs, implying that he is catching a cold. Alfred then reminds Bruce that a similar plan led to his former partner Robin (Jason Todd) losing his life. Afterwards, Bruce sees a vision of Robin (playing the role of Jacob Marley), which disturbs him throughout the rest of the night. He remembers earlier days fighting crime alongside Robin in colorful 60s-style uniforms, in contrast to his current mostly-black combat suit.

Batman responds to the Bat-Signal, where Commissioner Gordon tells Batman that Catwoman (playing the role of the Ghost of Christmas Past) has tipped off the GCPD that she has information about the Joker, but demands that she only talks to Batman. Confronting Catwoman, Batman discovers, as he suspected, that she was lying and only called him so she could "play with him", under nostalgia of their adventures together. Batman bluntly tells Catwoman he was never "playing", upon which she takes off leaping between rooftops. Batman chases Catwoman before falling several stories to the ground, as she watches wide-eyed from a distance.

Lying semi-conscious in an alley, Batman is confronted by the glowing figure of Superman (playing the role of the Ghost of Christmas Present), who uses X-ray vision to determine Batman is coming down with pneumonia, though Batman shrugs it off. Superman then takes Batman into the skies to watch ordinary Gothamites preparing for Christmas; Batman scoffs at his sentimentality. They then stop to watch Bob and Tim, then Commissioner Gordon talking with an officer about their differing opinions of Batman. Advising Batman to take time off and recover his health, Superman drops Batman off at the Batmobile, then flies off into the night.

Batman attempts to enter the Batmobile, which explodes upon activation and knocks him out. The Joker (playing the role of the Ghost of Christmas Future) arrives and drags the still-comatose Batman to a graveyard to be thrown alive into an open grave. While buried, Batman has a vision where Gotham is plunged into chaos after his death, with Gordon tried and convicted for cooperating with Batman's extra-legal activities, and civilians killing criminals in cold blood, mirroring Batman's ruthless behavior and black-and-white view of the world after Jason Todd's death.

Realizing what he has become, Batman digs himself free from the grave and saves Bob and Tim from the Joker, who has arrived at the apartment to brutally recover his money. The Joker holds Bob at gunpoint as Batman smashes in the apartment window. Bob manages to grab the Joker's gun and holds the latter at gunpoint, threatening to kill him, but Batman urges him to show his son the man he truly is: not a killer but a man who will protect his son. The Joker goads Bob to pull the trigger, but he lowers the gun and the Joker is arrested. Learning a new lesson in life, Batman returns to the Batcave and sleeps. Alfred pulls a blanket over him.

The next day, Bruce Wayne gives Bob an established job, a raise, medical coverage and an actual Christmas tree. The narrator is revealed to be Bob himself, relating the tale to Tim and asking him what he thought the moral of the story was. The story ends with a now-healthy Tim leaping Batman-style in a snowy Gotham street.

Reception
Rob Patey of Ain't It Cool News called Batman: Noël "an instant classic", complimenting Bermejo's "kinetic artwork" and his ability to keep the story grounded while deftly transcending reality. Shawn Morrissey of Outer Realm Comics was less impressed saying that it "is a good read, but it's all thanks to the source material" and that the overly realistic art ruins the comic book fantasy.

Video games
 In Batman: Arkham Origins, the Batman Noël batsuit is an alternate outfit which can be used in challenge mode, online multiplayer, and in Story mode after beating the main story on Normal or Hard. The skin can also be purchased as part of the "New Millennium Skin Pack".
 The 2015 video game Batman: Arkham Knight also offers the Noël batsuit as free DLC which was released for Christmas time.

See also
 Adaptations of A Christmas Carol

References

2011 graphic novels
2011 comics debuts
Batman graphic novels
Comics based on works by Charles Dickens
Crime comics
Works based on A Christmas Carol